Kentucky Route 2830 (KY 2830) is a two-lane, largely rural highway in northeastern Daviess County, Kentucky. The southern terminus is at KY 144 and the northern terminus is at KY 334. The road serves the community of Maceo.

Route description
KY 2830 begins at an intersection with KY 144 northwest of Thruston. From this intersection, the highway runs northeast, generally parallel to U.S. Route 60 (US 60) and US 231. KY 2830's first highway intersection is with KY 1831, also known as Wright's Landing Road. KY 2830 continues along a northeast heading alongside a CSX rail line.

KY 2830 then enters the community of Maceo, where it serves as the western terminus of KY 405. KY 2830 leaves Maceo, still following the railroad northeast, until its northern terminus at KY 334. KY 334 takes over the route for a very short distance and ends at US 60.

History
KY 2830 is the former routing of US 60, which was four-laned and relocated slightly to the north (in fact, the new four-lane US 60 is within sight of KY 2830 for quite a distance) on November 25, 1998. When US 60 was rerouted, as is customary in Kentucky, instead of turning over the old highway to a local agency, the state retained control and merely applied a new number, in this case KY 2830. Originally, all of KY 2830 was classified as a Supplemental Road by the Kentucky Transportation Cabinet. The portion of the route between KY 405 in Maceo and KY 334 north of Maceo was promoted to the Rural Secondary System on October 26, 2004.

When the new bypass around east Owensboro opened, KY 2830 was extended onto the old US 60 to the junction of KY 144, where the road ends.

Major intersections

References

External links

2830
Transportation in Daviess County, Kentucky
U.S. Route 60